Ewald Osers (13 May 1917 – 11 October 2011) was a Czech translator and poet born in Prague, Austria-Hungary.

Career

He translated several important Czech poetry works of the 20th century into English, including Jaroslav Seifert, Vítězslav Nezval, Miroslav Holub and Jan Skácel. He also translated several German-language authors such as Thomas Bernhard, as well as Macedonian-language books (Mateja Matevski), poetry of the Silesian poet Ondra Lysohorsky, and two major Slovak poets, Miroslav Válek and Milan Rúfus.

Selected bibliography 
Works

 Arrive Where We Started (poems), 1995
Snows of Yesteryear (memoir), 2007

Translations

 Modern Czech Poetry: An Anthology, 1945 (with J.K. Montgomery)
Richard Strauss, A Working Friendship: The Correspondence between Richard Strauss and Hugo von Hofmannsthal, 1961 (with H. Hammelmann)
Paul Carell, Scorched Earth: Hitler's War on Russia, Vol. 2, 1970
 Three Czech Poets: Vítězslav Nezval, Antonín Bartušek, Josef Hanzlík, 1971 (with G. Theiner)
 Óndra Łysohorsky, Selected Poems, 1971
 Reiner Kunze, With the Volume Turned Down, and Other Poems, 1973
 Contemporary German Poetry, 1976
 Rose Ausländer, Selected Poems, 1977
 Rudolf Langer, Wounded No Doubt: Selected Poems, 1979
 Nahapet Kuchak, A Hundred and One Hayrens, 1979
 Jaroslav Seifert, The Plague Column, 1979
 Walter Helmut Fritz, Without Remission: Selected Poems, 1981
 Sebastian Haffner, The Meaning of Hitler, 1983
 Jaroslav Seifert, An Umbrella from Piccadilly, 1983
 Miroslav Holub, On the Contrary, and Other Poems, 1984
 Nikola Vaptsarov, Nineteen Poems, 1984
 Voices from across the Water: Translations from Twelve Languages, 1985
 Karel Čapek, War with the Newts, 1985, new trans., 1990
 Lyubomir Levchev, Stolen Fire: Selected Poems, 1986
 The Selected Poetry of Jaroslav Seifert, 1986 (with G. Gibian)
 Miroslav Holub, The Fly, 1987 (with J. Milner and G. Theiner)
 Jaroslav Cejka, Michael Cernik, and Karel Sys, New Czech Poetry, 1988
 Vladimír Janovic, The House of the Tragic Poet, 1988
 Mateja Matevski, Footprints of the Wind: Selected Poems, 1988
Thomas Bernhard, Wittgenstein's Nephew, 1986
Thomas Bernhard, Cutting Timber, 1988
Thomas Bernhard, Old Masters, 1989
Thomas Bernhard, The Cheap-Eaters, 1990
 Miroslav Holub, Poems Before and After: Collected English Translations, 1990 (with I. Milner, J. Milner, and Theiner)
 Rüdiger Safranski, Schopenhauer and the Wild Years of Philosophy, 1990
 Thomas Bernhard, Yes, 1991
Ivan Klíma, Love and Garbage, 1991
Josef Hanzlík, Selected Poems, 1992 (with I. Milner and J. Milner)
 Michael Krüger, The End of the Novel, 1992
 Michael Krüger, The Man in the Ice, 1994
 Heinz Piontek, Selected Poems, 1994
Miroslav Válek, The Ground Beneath Our Feet: Selected Poems, 1996
 Albrecht Fölsing, Albert Einstein: A Biography, 1997
 Rüdiger Safranski, Martin Heidegger: A Master from Germany, 1997
Jan Skácel, Banned Man: Selected Poems, 2001
Milan Rúfus, And That's the Truth! Poems in English & Slovak, 2005

Awards
 1971: Schlegel-Tieck Prize, for Scorched Earth by Paul Carell
1987: European Poetry Translation Prize, for The Selected Poetry of Jaroslav Seifert

References

1917 births
2011 deaths
Austro-Hungarian Jews
Writers from Prague
Translators from Czech
Translators from Macedonian
Translators from Slovak
Translators to German
German–English translators
BBC World Service people
Czech emigrants to the United Kingdom
20th-century translators
Czechoslovak emigrants to the United Kingdom